Footscray High School is a multi-campus educational institution in Melbourne, Australia. Footscray College has formed a network with the University of Melbourne which gives students a better chance of getting into the University after they leave high school. The network provides opportunities for the college to enter into a structured program that focuses upon excellence in teaching and learning practice and the improvement of student learning outcomes.<

The college also offers the Select Entry Accelerated Learning (SEAL) Program, which provides a focused educational environment for academically gifted children.

The "Footscray City College Film and Television School" makes up the tertiary (TAFE) part of the college.

History
In March 1916, the Footscray Technical School began teaching at what is now Victoria University's Footscray Nicholson campus. In July 1958, the school was renamed "Footscray Technical College" in line with Education Department reforms to technical schools at that time. On 25 September 1968, it was renamed "Footscray Institute of Technology" (FIT).

On 1 July 1972, the secondary education part of the Institute was separated and named "Footscray Secondary Technical School". It continued to operate on the Nicholson St site. However, its council was not established until early 1975, a new site (on Ballarat Rd) was not acquired until 1975 and was not ready for occupation until May 1980. Thus during this period it remained closely linked to the Institute.

It eventually became known as "Footscray City Secondary College", and later, "Footscray City College". At the end of 2019 it merged with Gilmore College for Girls and was renamed to "Footscray High School", retaining both the Kinnear Street and Barkly Street campuses. In 2021, a third campus was opened at Pilgrim Street, next to Victoria University's Footscray Nicholson campus. Footscray High School continues its strong connections with Victoria University as members of the Footscray Learning Precinct, along with Footscray Primary School, Footscray City Primary School and the Integrated Early Learning Centre.

Notable alumni include Pompello fruit and vegetable retailers Elliott Cafarella and Jack Pardy, as well as MTV's Ruby Rose.

The tertiary component is known as "Footscray City Films".

Clubs
The college is home to a wealth of 'clubs' for its many students to participate in at their own command, which include the following:
 Chess Club;
 Photography Club;
 Caught Read Handed – reading club;
 CineCity Film Club;
 Debating Club;
 Dungeons & Dragons Club;
 Homework Club;
 the Great Victorian Bike Ride – training and participation;
 Sports training and in-house competitions;
 Anime Club; and lastly,
 Environment Club.

Student Leadership
The college provides its students with the following student leadership opportunities, again, but this time mostly, at their own command:
 a Student Representative Council;
 a STRIDE Peer Support Program (Years 7 & 10);
 a Duke of Edinburgh Awards Program;
 a High Resolve Global Citizenship Program (Years 8 & 10);
 a World Challenge Program (Years 9 – 11);
 a School for Student Leadership Program (Year 9); and finally,
 a Sports Coaching Program (Years 9 & 10).

References

External links
Official school website

Public high schools in Melbourne
1916 establishments in Australia
Educational institutions established in 1916